The 2013–14 season (officially known as Liga de Plata and also as Torneo Luis Baltazar Ramírez) will be El Salvador's Segunda División de Fútbol Salvadoreño The season will be split into two championships Apertura 2013 and Clausura 2014. The champions of the Apertura and Clausura play the direct promotion playoff every year. The winner of that series ascends to Primera División de Fútbol de El Salvador.

Promotion and relegation 2013–2014 season
Teams promoted to Primera División de Fútbol Profesional - Apertura 2013
 C.D. Dragon

Teams relegated to Segunda División de Fútbol Salvadoreño  - Apertura 2013
 Once Municipal

Teams relegated to Tercera División de Fútbol Profesional - Apertura 2013
 Espíritu Santo
 Arcense

Teams promoted from Tercera Division De Fútbol Profesional - Apertura 2013
 Real Destroyer ( Bought the spot of Isidro Metapan B )
 C.D. Chalatenango
 C.D. Topiltzín
 C.D. Sonsonate ( Bought the spot of C.D. Titán )

Teams that failed to register for the Apertura 2013
 Metapan B (Sold their spot to Real Destroyer)
 C.D. Titán (Sold their spot to Sonsonate)

Teams

Personnel and sponsoring

Apertura

Apertura 2013 Group standings

Grupo Centro Occidente

Grupo Centro Oriente

Second stage

Finals

First Leg

Second Leg

Individual awards

Clausura

Personnel and sponsoring

Clausura 2013 Group standings

Grupo Centro Occidente

Grupo Centro Oriente

Second stage

Finals

First Leg

Second Leg

Individual awards

Aggregate table

Grupo Centro Oriente

Grupo Centro Occidente

References

External links
 https://archive.today/20130807152309/http://www.futbolsv.com/category/segunda-division/
 http://www.culebritamacheteada.com.sv/category/nacional/segunda-division-nacional/ 

Segunda División de Fútbol Salvadoreño seasons
2013–14 in Salvadoran football
EL Sal